Cedar Grove is an unincorporated community in Wood County, West Virginia, United States.

The community took its name from a nearby plantation of the same name, which was noted for its grove of cedar trees.

References 

Unincorporated communities in West Virginia
Unincorporated communities in Wood County, West Virginia